The Actino-ugpB RNA motif is a conserved RNA structure that was discovered by bioinformatics.
Actino-ugpB motifs are found in strains of the species Gardnerella vaginalis, within the phylum Actinomycetota.

It is ambiguous whether Actino-ugpB RNAs function as cis-regulatory elements or whether they operate in trans.  Many of the RNAs are upstream of the gene 'ugpB', which encodes a protein putatively involved in sugar transport.  However, several of the RNAs are not located upstream of a protein-coding gene.  Structurally, the motif consists of two hairpins with conserved nucleotides located in the stems and outside of the hairpins, but not in their terminal loops.

References

RNA
Bioinformatics